Awaken is the debut studio album by The Empire Shall Fall, released on November 17, 2009 through Angle Side Side Records, owned by The Empire Shall Fall's bassist, Nick Sollecito. Awaken features the vocal talents of Killswitch Engage vocalist Jesse Leach. The band cites its influences as At the Gates, Meshuggah, and Edge of Sanity. Awaken draws heavily upon the band members' interests in jazz, punk, and experimental music. The album reflects heavily on the themes of  politics and transcendentalism. Lyrically the album advocates positivity, unity, and empowerment. Historical inspirations for the album have been cited as Jello Biafra, Benjamin Franklin, Cynthia McKinney, and Ron Paul.

Track listing
 "Awaken" – 5:03
 "Lords of War" – 3:37
 "Voices Forming Weapons" – 4:08
 "Choir of Angels" – 6:01
 "We The People" – 5:50
 "These Colors Bleed" – 4:35
 "Our Own" – 5:24
 "The Kingdom" – 4:55

Personnel
 Jesse Leach - vocals
 Jake Davenport - lead guitar
 Marcus de Lisle - guitar
 Nick Sollecito - bass guitar
 Jeff Pitts - drums, percussion

Technical personnel
 Producer - Marcus de Lisle
 Sound Engineer - Sean Small
 Graphic Designer - Matthew Yezuita
 Photographer - Emily Stamp
 P&R - Kim Kelly/Catharsis PR

References

2009 debut albums
The Empire Shall Fall albums